The 1956 Cork Senior Football Championship was the 68th staging of the Cork Senior Football Championship since its establishment by the Cork County Board in 1887. 

Lees entered the championship as the defending champions.

On 25 November 1956, St. Finbarr's won the championship following a 3-05 to 0-04 defeat of Millstreet in the final. This was their first championship title.

Results

Final

Miscellaneous

 St Finbarr's win their first title.
 St Finbarr's become the first club since Midleton in 1916 to win titles in both football and hurling as a single club.
 Millstreet qualify for their last final to date.

References

Cork Senior Football Championship